Satanella is an English-language opera by Michael William Balfe, written to a libretto by A. Harris and Edmund Falconer, and premiered at Royal Opera House, Covent Garden, 20 December 1858.

Recordings
Satanella – Victorian Opera Northwest: Sally Silver (soprano); Catherine Carby, Christine Tocci, Elizabeth Sikora (mezzo-sopranos); Kang Wang (tenor); Quentin Hayes, Anthony Gregory, Frank Church (baritones); Trevor Bowes (bass); Victorian Opera Orchestra and John Powell Singers, Richard Bonynge conducting  NAXOS 8.660378-79

References

External links
 

Operas
English-language operas
Operas by Michael Balfe
1858 operas